Joel Wood may refer to:
Joel Wood (musician), Canadian musician
Joel Wood (soccer), Australian football (soccer) player